Aleshia Brevard (December 9, 1937 – July 1, 2017) was an American author and actress of stage, screen, and television.  She worked as an entertainer, actress, model, Playboy bunny, professor of theater, and author. She also underwent one of the early sex reassignment surgery procedures performed in the United States. Brevard lived her life outside of the wider transgender community, and as a result, she was not publicly identified as transgender until publishing her memoirs in her later years.

Early life
Brevard was born in Erwin, Tennessee on December 9, 1937, growing up in a religious family in a rural part of central Tennessee. She was close to her mother. Brevard always felt different from other children, like a girl inside, and prayed nightly to wake up a girl. Her teen years were awkward, and after a romantic disappointment in high school, she left right after graduation for the West Coast.

San Francisco and transition
Ending up in San Francisco, Brevard found a job as a female impersonator at Finocchio's Club in San Francisco under the stage name Lee Shaw in the early 1960s, doing Marilyn Monroe impressions, eventually achieving enough renown that Marilyn herself came to a performance.

Brevard began her transition at 21 under the care of famed gender specialist Harry Benjamin in the late 1950s. At Benjamin's recommendation, Brevard underwent the surgical reassignment procedure in Los Angeles's Westlake Clinic under the care of surgeon Elmer Belt.

Brevard later worked as a stripper in Reno and as a Playboy bunny.

Education
After a year's recovery post-surgery, she enrolled as a student at Middle Tennessee State University for her undergraduate education. During this period, she became more comfortable with her womanhood, got married, and took classes. This was at a time when she was a working actress, touring the U.S. doing theater, and working in film or television. She gained membership in Hollywood unions, and ultimately got her master's degree in Theater from Middle Tennessee State.

Through Benjamin, Brevard became friends in the late 1950s and 1960s with other transgender patients of his, including Charlotte Frances McLeod and Kathy Taylor, and they became a support network for each other. They had lunches with Benjamin, whom they considered to be a paternal mentor and friend.

Attitude towards gender
Brevard's was one of the early medical transitions, and occurred before the term transgender had been coined and before there was a transgender community in San Francisco.

Brevard did not identify as trans early in her life and often deflected questions. Her husbands were not aware that she had transitioned. However she decided to change because she realized she was denying her own personal history. Once her memoir was published in 2001, she started to become labeled a "transsexual writer" and "transsexual actress". As she stated in her second book, "I'd been labeled—forced into a transsexual mold."

"Professionally, both as a film/stage actress and, later, as a university professor of theatre, my life was lived outside the gender community. Only after publishing two memoirs, when in my 60s and 70s, did I first hear the term 'transgender' and become aware of the community's stated agenda," she said in an interview in 2013. She also said in April 2017 "I did not go through gender reassignment to be labeled transsexual. I look at that as an awkward phase that I went through—sort of like a really painful adolescence. I don't even think of myself now in terms as transsexual. That's something I experienced and (something) I was.

"For me, as well as for my early sisters, the goal was never to live with a 't' before our names. Our objective was to blend so thoroughly that the things mixed could not be recognized. It was a choice, made not because we felt any shame about our transsexual history, but because our goal had always been to live fully as the women we'd been born to be."

In the book Bodies in the Making: Transgressions and Transformations (2006) by Nancy N. Chen, Brevard is interviewed by Mary Weaver discussing topics like gender, gender reassignment, the importance of personal history, and personal transformation.

Later life
After her work in television and film, she returned to Tennessee and received her M.A. in Theater Arts from Middle Tennessee State University. She met her first husband in Tennessee and had other marriages, which, according to her sister, did not work out. She returned to California in the late 1990s, settling outside of Santa Cruz, California with an old friend, finding work as a substitute teacher, and doing community theater.

Aleshia Brevard died at home in Scotts Valley, California on July 1, 2017 at the age of 79.

Works

Film and television

Theater

See also

 List of transgender people
 List of transgender-related topics

Sources

References

External links
 Official website
 

1937 births
2017 deaths
Actresses from San Francisco
American memoirists
American women memoirists
Marshall University alumni
Middle Tennessee State University alumni
Transgender academics
Transgender actresses
Transgender female models
LGBT people from Tennessee
Transgender memoirists
Writers from San Francisco
20th-century American actresses
People from Unicoi County, Tennessee
People from Scotts Valley, California
21st-century American LGBT people
American LGBT actors